Daniela Hantuchová was the defending champion but lost in the fourth round to Amanda Coetzer.

Kim Clijsters won in the final 6–4, 7–5 against Lindsay Davenport.

Seeds
A champion seed is indicated in bold text while text in italics indicates the round in which that seed was eliminated. All thirty-two seeds received a bye to the second round.

  Kim Clijsters (champion)
  Jennifer Capriati (semifinals)
  Daniela Hantuchová (fourth round)
  Lindsay Davenport (final)
  Amélie Mauresmo (quarterfinals)
  Jelena Dokić (second round)
  Anastasia Myskina (second round)
  Chanda Rubin (quarterfinals)
  Patty Schnyder (second round)
  Magdalena Maleeva (third round)
  Anna Pistolesi (second round)
  Eleni Daniilidou (third round)
  Elena Bovina (fourth round)
  Elena Dementieva (fourth round)
  Nathalie Dechy (fourth round)
  Amanda Coetzer (quarterfinals)
  Silvia Farina Elia (third round)
  Lisa Raymond (third round)
  Tatiana Panova (second round)
  Paola Suárez (second round)
  Ai Sugiyama (fourth round)
  Alexandra Stevenson (second round)
  Meghann Shaughnessy (fourth round)
  Clarisa Fernández (second round)
  Elena Likhovtseva (third round)
  Conchita Martínez (semifinals)
  Katarina Srebotnik (third round)
  Iva Majoli (second round)
  Tamarine Tanasugarn (third round)
  Laura Granville (second round)
  Francesca Schiavone (third round)
  Janette Husárová (second round)

Draw

Finals

Top half

Section 1

Section 2

Section 3

Section 4

Bottom half

Section 5

Section 6

Section 7

Section 8

Qualifying

Qualifying seeds

Qualifiers

Qualifying draw

First qualifier

Second qualifier

Third qualifier

Fourth qualifier

Fifth qualifier

Sixth qualifier

Seventh qualifier

Eighth qualifier

Ninth qualifier

Tenth qualifier

Eleventh qualifier

Twelfth qualifier

References

External links
 Official results archive (ITF)
 Official results archive (WTA)

2003 Pacific Life Open
Pacific Life Open